is a Japanese manga series written and illustrated by Crystal na Yōsuke. It was serialized in Shogakukan's Weekly Shōnen Sunday from April 2008 to February 2011, with its chapters collected in 11 tankōbon volumes.

Plot
Tadashi Imamoto is in his second year of junior high school and is a member of the handicraft club and loves nothing more than knitting. Unfortunately he is in a secret relationship with Saya, the leader of a notorious all-girl gang, who says she will kill him and herself if anyone is to find out about it.

As the plot progresses the power of the relationship not so subtly shifts from Saya to Tadashi, in several cases debilitating Saya's ability to act and causing her to have a nose bleed and faint at the thought of receiving affection from Tadashi.

Characters

She possesses superhuman strength, as she is able to destroy a wall without thinking. She harbors feelings for Tadashi, but has to hide it to keep the impression on her gang that she is the strongest and biggest man hater of them all, as she has stated to Tadashi that if they are found out of their secret she will kill him and herself. When Saya is alone with Tadashi, she has a sweet love-struck girl personality, and usually asks to be punished in some life threatening way for harming him earlier to keep up her image. She loves him so much that she could not get within 100 meters of his house without fainting and blushes deeply anytime any close action between them happens. 
She later takes up a disguise as a first year girl named Angie who is interested in the arts and crafts club, this being so she can be closer to Tadashi, as she realized they rarely spend any time together. With this personality she is able to say things she would normally be too embarrassed to say to him. Because of how effective this persona is, she thinks she accidentally created a love triangle between herself and this new persona for Tadashi's heart. She is unaware that Tadashi knows Angie is herself and is only playing along. Her father runs a very successful electronics company and she has a little sister named Cupid, though it appears that she does not like her father, calling him Old Man.

Tadashi is a student in his second year of junior high school and is a member of the handicraft club who loves nothing more than knitting and his skills are good enough to make stuff animals. He is s also in love with Saya. Later on in the story, he becomes the vice-president of the school council, although he did not want to do this. He is a good-hearted guy, as he will go out of his way to protect Saya or anyone else. While doing his duties as the vice-president, he acts as somewhat of a personal servant to Saki since she is so weak when she does any manual labor he describes it as if she "is in a death struggle". He truly does love Saya, and will go out of his way to protect their secret relationship or her in situations where he can. He also becomes depressed when he is unable to spend time with her. Also when he describes his girlfriend to others, he often states how she might come off as tough but is a very sweet and cute girl, as well as the type of girl that if she had to choose between him and her friends, even if it was to save them from falling off a cliff and only had enough strength for one, she would try with all her might to save both. He then reveals to Angie (Saya in disguise) that at first he was afraid of Saya when they first met, but overtime he quickly fell in love with her.

Onigashira

Yuna is a member of the gang, and is known for her samurai garb and eyepatch (when she does not wear her eyepatch her hair covers her eye, though her eye is perfectly fine). She is often seen wielding two bokutōs and she is very skilled with them, which she treasure as it was a gift given to her from her brother when she was young. She is also the most protective of Saya, going as far as to dress up "lady-like" to fool Saya's sister, and at practically any moment will come and fight. She is displayed as a tomboy to the point some believe she is really a guy, though she has a desire to appear more girly. However she usually attacks anyone nearby out of embarrassment after doing something she considers girly. She has a developed a crush on the Student Council President after he told her that if anyone made fun of her for being more girly he would "purify them", but will try to beat him out of embarrassment, even if she thinks about him in another room she will run over to where he is and beat him. She is considered dumb, as she nearly was able to figure out that Saya and Tadashi were dating, only to stop because her head started to hurt from thinking. She has a brother who is a cross-dresser, where ironically he is mistaken to be a girl, looking like a younger and more feminine version of Yuna, while wearing women's clothing. However, he is much stronger than her and inline to inherit the family Dojo, who wishes to change it to be completely girly. Yuna first joined up with Saya was because her amazement of her strength and her wish for Saya to train her so she could defeat her brother and this also explains why she is the most battle-hungry member of the gang.

A 14-year old girl whose childlike appearance tends to fool people, however, she is a master of guerrilla warfare. She is obsessed with Saya, often trying to look at her panties, kissing a doll version of her, and usually found sitting on her lap in class. When she is wearing a bear costume she appears to gain certain bear-like abilities. Her weapon is a toy hammer with a cute bear's head on it, but the toy hammer will become a scythe when she is in her serious mode. After Tadashi gave her a stuffed bear he made that she affectionately calls Kumarou, she has become friends with him, calling him "Nice-moto" and asked him to make her a stuff doll of Saya with glasses (one he keeps a few of as well). This making her the "first" Onigashira to befriend a male. She was referred to as ōjousama, suggesting she might be rich or related to yakuza.

She is the spy of the group. She has very thin legs which are covered by a long skirt, always wears a bandanna over her face and she fights using a large two prong sword connected to a long chain. She has a very laid back demeanor and never speaks, though she can and mimic voices perfectly. Momo knows that Tadashi and Saya are in love, and in her own way tries to help them to keep their secret. Momo was the former member of the Haō-sō gang, being the third Haō-sō, which sent her to spy on Onigashira so when the time was right she could kill Saya. During her time in the Haō-sō, she was the Vermillion Bird of the South", and wore a mask supposed to represent a Phoenix. Her mission was to become friends with the members of the gang, specially befriend Saya, so that she could not attack one her friends and her original gang could take the heads of "kings", one them being Saya. But she realized that all the other members really liked her as part of the gang and apologized to her for not noticing sooner that she was suffering as to betray them. She could finish her mission accepting that they are truly her friends and was welcomed back. Because of her acts as a spy, the Haō-sō know of Saya and Tadashi's relationship. It is also implied by both Amane and Tadashi's mother that she may have developed feelings for Tadashi. She also seems to be involved with the student council under the alias Sumomo, where Saki is the only one to point out she is Momo where everyone else thinks she is wrong, but this could either be because she wants to infiltrate it or just act as a normal student.

Student council

The president of the school council. He has rehabilitated 999 juvenile delinquents so far, and targets Saya and the Onigashira to accomplish in rehabilitating 1,000 juvenile delinquents, though he seems to do this simply by changing their appearance to match the "ideal" student. Tomeo is basically immortal, an ability he attributes to his belief in justice, which cannot die. However, when he realizes that he himself done something wrong, he becomes full of self-hatred and is injured via a lightning bolt that strikes him. He is often seen praying to an odd statue with the letter J on its head, calling it the god of justice, every time he seeks guidance. He is considered the worst enemy by the Onigashira. Later, he selects Tadashi to become the vice-president of the school; the position was open because he is so obnoxious that no one wanted it. Tomeo is constantly surrounded by evil spirits, as stated by Shū. He is actually a good-hearted guy, but what he does to help is often considered extremely annoying by others. And though seemingly stupid, he has displayed a good insight on people, he defended Yuna's desire to be more feminine, and was able to tell her brother Yumi was a male at first glance. Also he scores a perfect 100 on tests. His passion for justice seems to cloud his common sense, demonstrated when he is overjoyed when Yumi Suzune challenges his position, even offering his support, before Tadashi reminds him that he will no longer be the president if he wins. He has long white hair, that is ironically, clearly against the standards of the school.

The student council treasurer and granddaughter of the principal. Like her position, she often thinks of how much something is going to cost. She keeps track of the damage of what the gang causes and gives them a bill every time she runs into them. Saki is portrayed as being extremely weak and delicate, as she could not open a door Mitsuki could easily and just by trying injured her fingers, though Saya is jealous of her lack of strength because of all the attention Tadashi gives her from it. If she gets angry enough, she displays a terrifying power and swears a lot, though she appears to be unaware of this. She appears to be the only competent member of the student council, where the students will talk to her with issues rather than the President. Tadashi helps out Saki a lot because of her weak state and his helpfulness lead her to fall in love with him. This lead for her to cling and protect Tadashi which made many people believe they are dating. Later, due to her growing feelings as well as Saya's posing as Angie, she too has disguised herself as a new member of the Hand Crafts club. When Saki gets emotional over the school's finances and breaks out into a grumble, she has a tendency to revert to her grandmother's native dialect.

The student council's secretary, described as "cool and mysterious" by the President. He always carries a cross sword (later revealed to be a radish) and has been said to use it on the President, who does not mind since he is invincible. He later states he is a spirit hunter and regularly attacks the president because he is surrounded by evil spirits, being the main reason he joined the student council was to exorcise the spirits from him. His exorcism techniques involve housekeeping and kitchen utensils; as such he is also a good housekeeper and cook, to the point that Tadashi calls him an aspiring househusband. He also seems to know a lot of good ways to save money. He is rarely seen and will appear suddenly when a spirit appears, this is due to him exorcising spirits around the school.

Haō-sō
The  is a rival gang that aims for the defeat of the Onigashira. To that end they had Momo infiltrate the Onigashira to get close to Saya and eventually kill her. But Momo became too friendly with them and defected from the Haō-sō at the last minute. They each wear an animal helmet based on the Chinese constellations. Because when Momo was their spy, they know of Tadashi's and Saya's relationship, believing that has something to do with her sudden increase in strength, so their overall plan is to take control of all the gangs in all the schools by inciting the students to protest against mixed sex education, ultimately splitting them up. However it has been noted that they could be doing this solely for the reason to not interact with the opposite sex because the Haō-sō has trouble interacting with the opposite gender. In the end, the members of Haō-sō resolved their issues, and the group disbanded.

  "Heavenly Dragon" "The Azure Dragonof the East"
He is the leader of the Haō-sō. He wears a helmet that seems to look like, or represents a dragon, and has a hard time seeing while wearing it, being a running gag that he is facing the wrong direction when talking. He looks similar to Saya. His gynophobia is so extreme that he sweats profusely when around girls while not wearing his helmet. He states he developed this after his secret girlfriend dumped him over her friends, though this is most likely a lie to split apart Saya and Tadashi, later confirmed to be true by Aoi. He joined the student council after the president offered him a position, seeing how quickly he stopped the ruckus (which were caused by his cohorts) to be vice-vice president, though he constantly decides to drop out while working around Saki. He keeps coming up with plans to bring them together to ultimately break up Saya and Tadashi, but is constantly stopped because of his gynophobia. The only people that do not activate his gynophobia is Aoi and Momo, this is because at one time they were teammates which he states "teammates are alright". His name is a pun off his title, as tatsu can also mean dragon in Japanese (though the kanji does not mean "dragon" per se).
  "Tiger King" "The White Tiger of the West"
The second Haō-sō. He wears a tiger helmet and is the tallest of the group. He goes into a horrifying love-love mode with any girl who comes in contact with him, and snaps out of his girl-craziness trance when he hugs Tatsumi. President Kinoshita thinks Toraya is Yuna's boyfriend, though this is mainly because of an incident where she touched him. Later, however, he was able to behave normally around women. His name is a pun off his title, as  means tiger in Japanese.
, a.k.a.  "Armored Horn" "The Black Tortoise of the North"
She is the fourth Haō-sō. Her helmet is supposed to look like a tortoise, or symbolizes it. She comes from Akita Prefecture, and is mortified to have boys hear her speak in her dialect when she gets excited, to the point of beating them up because of it. She does not set off Tatsumi's gynophobic reaction, because "teammates are alright", even though Akito falls for her if she touches him and she beats them up if they hear her speak in her dialect. Aoi has been developing a more urban attitude and broke off from the Haō-sō. Her name is a pun off her title, as  means Turtle in Japanese.

Publication
Onidere, written and illustrated by Crystal na Yōsuke, was serialized in Shogakukan Weekly Shōnen Sunday April 2, 2008, to February 16, 2011. Shogakukan collected its chapters in eleven tankōbon volumes, released from September 18, 2008, to May 18, 2011.

Volume list

See also
Love Is Like a Cocktail, another web manga series by the same author
Otokonoko Zuma, another web manga series by the same author

References

External links
 

Romantic comedy anime and manga
School life in anime and manga
Shogakukan manga
Shōnen manga